Udumbanchola State assembly constituency is one of the 140 state legislative assembly constituencies at the state Kerala in southern India. It is also one of the 7 state legislative assembly constituencies included in the Idukki Lok Sabha constituency. As of the 2021 assembly elections, the current MLA is M. M. Mani of CPI(M).

Local self governed segments
Udumbanchola Niyamasabha constituency is composed of the following local self-governed segments:

Members of Legislative Assembly 
The following list contains all members of Kerala legislative assembly who have represented the constituency:

Key

Election results 
Percentage change (±%) denotes the change in the number of votes from the immediate previous election.

Niyamasabha Election 2021 
There were 1,67,459 registered voters in the constituency for the 2021 Kerala Niyamasabha Election.

Niyamasabha Election 2016 
There were 1,66,770 registered voters in the constituency for the 2016 Kerala Niyamasabha Election.

Niyamasabha Election 2011 
There were 1,53,563 registered voters in the constituency for the 2011 election.

See also
 Udumbanchola
 Idukki district
 List of constituencies of the Kerala Legislative Assembly
 2016 Kerala Legislative Assembly election

References 

Assembly constituencies of Kerala

State assembly constituencies in Idukki district